Kermit Ruffins (born December 19, 1964) is an American jazz trumpeter, singer, composer, and actor from New Orleans. He has been influenced by Louis Armstrong and Louis Jordan and says that the highest note he can hit on trumpet is a high C. He often accompanies his songs with his own vocals. Most of his bands perform New Orleans jazz standards though he also composes many of his own pieces. Jon Pareles of The New York Times wrote, "Mr. Ruffins is an unabashed entertainer who plays trumpet with a bright, silvery tone, sings with off-the-cuff charm and never gets too abstruse in his material."

Early life 

He started playing trumpet in 8th grade at Lawless Junior High School in the Ninth Ward of New Orleans. He attended Joseph S. Clark High School in the 6th Ward and St Peter Claver Church in Tremé. In high school, he played a little bit of classical music at the behest of a strict band teacher.

He developed an appreciation for cooking from his grandmother, observing her movements in the kitchen.

Career

Rebirth Brass Band 
Ruffins co-founded the Rebirth Brass Band in 1983 while attending Clark High School in the Tremé neighborhood. He made his first recordings with the Rebirth band in 1984. The group was inspired by The Dirty Dozen Brass Band, a band of slightly older musicians credited with bringing influences of funk and contemporary bebop into New Orleans style brass bands. Before they achieved the popularity which allowed them to play regularly in local music venues, the Rebirth often busked around the French Quarter for tips. They soon became a "house band" at the Glass House, previously the Dirty Dozen's home venue. Rebirth once had a gig in New York City at Lone Star Cafe, but they were hassled by police for having no permit when they began marching outdoors as is common practice in New Orleans.

Barbecue Swingers 
Ruffins founded the Barbecue Swingers in 1992, a traditional jazz quintet. He is known for cooking on a barbecue at his shows. Every Thursday since the early 1990s, they played a show at Vaughan's Bar in the Bywater neighborhood which was very popular with both locals and visitors. His 2007 Basin Street Records release, Live at Vaughan's was recorded during one of his performances there. They currently play a regular Thursday night gig at Bullet's Sports Bar on AP Tureaud Ave.

He has also performed at hundreds of funerals during his career in the Crescent City. In 2003 the band received a nomination at the Big Easy Entertainment Awards, which recognizes local talents.

Other work 
Ruffins is interviewed on screen and appears in performance footage in the 2005 documentary film Make It Funky!, which presents a history of New Orleans music and its influence on rhythm and blues, rock and roll, funk and jazz. In the film, he performs "Skokiaan" as part of a trumpet challenge with Irvin Mayfield and Troy Andrews.

He appeared as himself in HBO's Treme as a recurring character.

Ruffins also performed a rendition of The Bare Necessities for Disney's 2016 remake of The Jungle Book, alongside actor Bill Murray.

Discography

Filmography
 Make It Funky! (2005), documentary film
 New Orleans Music in Exile (2006), documentary film
 After the Catch (2007)
 Treme (2010)
 The Real World New Orleans (2010)
 The Jungle Book (2016)

Awards

 2003 – Offbeat'''s Best of the Beat Awards in Best Traditional Jazz Band or Performer for Kermit Ruffins and the Barbecue Swingers

 See also 
 List of people from New Orleans, Louisiana
 Rebirth Brass Band
 Treme (TV Series)

References

External links

 Satchmo.com profile
 Basin Street Records page
 The Best New Orleans Jazz Musicians
 Jazz Musicians Ask if Their Scene Will Survive, Ruffins quoted in The New York Times'' about Hurricane Katrina's effect on the New Orleans jazz scene
Kermit Ruffins Ruffins' MusiCodex Page
 Not Just Another Thursday Night: Kermit Ruffins And Vaughan's Lounge
 

1964 births
African-American jazz composers
African-American jazz musicians
American jazz singers
American jazz trumpeters
American male trumpeters
Jazz musicians from New Orleans
Living people
Rhythm and blues musicians from New Orleans
Singers from Louisiana
21st-century trumpeters
American male jazz composers
American jazz composers
21st-century American male musicians
Treme Brass Band members
Rebirth Brass Band members
African-American Catholics
21st-century African-American musicians
20th-century African-American people